Ploceus melanotis may refer to:

 redundant name of little weaver
 invalid name for red-headed weaver